The NCAA Beach Volleyball Championship is an NCAA-sanctioned tournament to determine the national champions of collegiate women's beach volleyball. It is a National Collegiate Championship featuring teams from Division I, Division II and Division III, and is the 90th, and newest, NCAA championship event. It was the first new NCAA championship to be created since the NCAA Division III Men's Volleyball Championship in 2012, and the first for women since the NCAA Bowling Championship in 2004.

History
The championship was approved by the NCAA Convention during the fall of 2015, and a committee was selected to determine the tournament's organizational structure.  Before 2015, sand volleyball had been part of the NCAA Emerging Sports for Women program (which included women's ice hockey, bowling, rowing, and water polo in the past). As such, a separate championship had been contested annually, since 2012, by the American Volleyball Coaches Association. Before 2012 several championships were televised by Collegiate Nationals. As of 2015, over 50 schools (from Divisions I, II, and III) had sponsored sand volleyball, ten more than the total number of required programs.

The sport's name was changed from "sand volleyball" to the more usual "beach volleyball" in June 2015, and the committee overseeing the sport is now named the NCAA Beach Volleyball Committee.

Structure

2016–2021

The championship is held each May. From 2016 through 2021, eight teams participated, in a double-elimination style tournament with a single-elimination final, under standard beach volleyball rules. All matches consist of five sets, with each team needing to win three sets to advance.

The NCAA does not add automatic qualifiers until two championship seasons have passed; but in 2016, the top 3 teams from the east and west were given automatic bids with 2 additional teams invited at-large.

As of fall 2019, seven conferences sponsor beach volleyball, all with at least six members — the minimum number for a conference to qualify for an automatic bid to other NCAA championship tournaments. Five of these conferences were represented in the inaugural tournament; the exceptions are the Ohio Valley Conference and Southland Conference, both of which begin beach volleyball sponsorship in the upcoming 2020 season.  
 ASUN Conference (7 members)
 Big West Conference (7 members)
 Coastal Collegiate Sports Association (12 members)
 Ohio Valley Conference (6 members)
 Pac-12 Conference (9 members)
 Southland Conference (9 members)
 West Coast Conference (7 members)

2022–present
From 2022 onwards, the championship tournament was expanded to 16 teams. As of spring 2022, eight conferences sponsor beach volleyball, and the winners of each conference will receive automatic bids for the championship.

 ASUN Conference
 Big West Conference
 Coastal Collegiate Sports Association
 Conference USA
 Ohio Valley Conference
 Pac-12 Conference
 Southland Conference
 West Coast Conference

Additionally, two teams from the East Region and two teams from the West Region will be given bids by the NCAA beach volleyball committee, while the final four teams will be selected at large.

Results

Summary

Cumulative results

Result by school and by year 

Twenty-one teams have appeared in the NCAA Tournament in at least one year starting with 2016. The results for all years are shown in this table below.

The code in each cell represents the furthest the team made it in the respective tournament:
  National Champion
  National Runner-up
  3rd place
  4th place
  Tied for 5th place
  Tied for 7th place
  Participant (tournament in progress)

Broadcasting 
Turner Sports held broadcast rights to the tournament for the first two years (2016 and 2017), with early-round coverage airing on TruTV, and the championship game broadcast on TBS. In December 2017, ESPN signed a multiyear agreement to broadcast the NCAA Women's Beach Volleyball Championship through 2022.

See also

American Volleyball Coaches Association – previous sponsor of collegiate beach volleyball tournaments in the United States
NCAA Men's Indoor Volleyball Championships (National Collegiate, Division III)
NCAA Women's Indoor Volleyball Championships (Division I, Division II, Division III)
NAIA Women's Beach Volleyball Invitational
List of NCAA women's beach volleyball programs

References

External links
 NCAA Awards 2016 and 2017 National Championship Sites
 NCAA Emerging Sports: Sand Volleyball  
 College Beach Volleyball

College women's beach volleyball in the United States
Beach volleyball
Beach volleyball competitions
USA
NCAA Women's Beach Volleyball